The Journal of Experimental Psychology: Human Perception and Performance is a peer-reviewed academic journal published by the American Psychological Association. It was established in 1975 as an independent section of the Journal of Experimental Psychology and covers research in experimental psychology. The journal "publishes studies on perception, control of action, perceptual aspects of language processing, and related cognitive processes."

The journal has implemented the Transparency and Openness Promotion (TOP) Guidelines.  The TOP Guidelines provide structure to research planning and reporting and aim to make research more transparent, accessible, and reproducible. 

The journal includes three types of articles: 
 Observations
 Reports
 Commentary

The editor-in-chief is Isabel Gauthier (Vanderbilt University).

Abstracting and indexing 
The journal is abstracted and indexed by MEDLINE/PubMed and the Social Sciences Citation Index. According to the Journal Citation Reports, the journal has a 2020 impact factor of 3.332.

References

External links 
 

American Psychological Association academic journals
English-language journals
Bimonthly journals
Publications established in 1975
Perception journals